Meerim Zhumanazarova (Мээрим Жуманазарова; born 9 November 1999) is a Kyrgyzstani freestyle wrestler. She holds the title of Master of Sport of International Class in Kyrgyzstan. She won a bronze medal in the women's 68 kg event at the 2020 Summer Olympics in Tokyo, Japan. She also won the gold medal in the same event at the 2021 World Wrestling Championships in Oslo, Norway.

Career 
She claimed a bronze medal in the women's 68kg freestyle event during the 2018 Asian Games.

In 2020, she won the gold medal in the women's 68 kg event at the Individual Wrestling World Cup held in Belgrade, Serbia. She qualified to represent Kyrgyzstan at the 2020 Summer Olympics in Tokyo, Japan.

In June 2021, she won one of the bronze medals in her event at the 2021 Poland Open held in Warsaw, Poland.

On 3 August 2021, she won the bronze medal in the women's freestyle 68 kg at the 2020 Summer Olympics.

In 2022, she won the silver medal in the 68 kg event at the Yasar Dogu Tournament held in Istanbul, Turkey. She also won the silver medal in her event at the 2022 Asian Wrestling Championships held in Ulaanbaatar, Mongolia. She won the gold medal in the 68 kg event at the 2021 Islamic Solidarity Games held in Konya, Turkey. She competed in the 68 kg event at the 2022 World Wrestling Championships held in Belgrade, Serbia.

She won one of the bronze medals in her event at the 2023 Ibrahim Moustafa Tournament held in Alexandria, Egypt.

References

External links 
 

1999 births
Living people
Kyrgyzstani female sport wrestlers
Wrestlers at the 2018 Asian Games
Medalists at the 2018 Asian Games
Asian Games bronze medalists for Kyrgyzstan
Asian Games medalists in wrestling
Asian Wrestling Championships medalists
Wrestlers at the 2020 Summer Olympics
Olympic wrestlers of Kyrgyzstan
Olympic bronze medalists for Kyrgyzstan
Olympic medalists in wrestling
Medalists at the 2020 Summer Olympics
World Wrestling Championships medalists
21st-century Kyrgyzstani women